Upcountry may refer to:

 Upcountry (South Carolina), a historical name for the Upstate region in South Carolina in the United States
 Upcountry History Museum, Greenville, South Carolina
 Upcountry (North America), a historical name for the Upland South of the United States
 Upcountry (Sri Lanka), areas of Sri Lanka away from the coast
 Upcountry Tamil, Indian Tamils of Sri Lankas (vis-à-vis Sri Lankan Tamils)
 Upcountry National Front, a Sri Lankan political party
 Up-Country People's Front, a Sri Lankan political party

See also
 Up Country (disambiguation)
 
 Uncountry